The J.T. Patterson Labs Building (PAT) is a building on the University of Texas at Austin campus, in the U.S. state of Texas. The building was completed in 1967.

References

1967 establishments in Texas
University and college buildings completed in 1967
University of Texas at Austin campus